Al-Husayn Husam al-Din ibn Idris Imad al-Din was the 21st Tayyibi Isma'ili Dāʿī al-Muṭlaq in Yemen.

Life
He succeeded his brother al-Hasan Badr al-Din II in 1512, and held the post until his death in 1527, when he was succeeded by his son Ali Shams al-Din III.

Towards the end of his life Moulana's health became poor and all of the affairs of D`awat were entrusted to Syedi Hasan bin Nuh. Any correspondence received from Hind, Sind or Yemen was referred to Syedi Hasan bin Nuh and he would attend to it. Syedi Hasan bin Nuh was a native of Bharuch, a town in Gujarat, India. He was a prominent trader, distinguished scholar and had trade relations in Yemen and other Arab lands. He settled in Yemen in 1498 and became student of previous dai, al-Hasan Badr al-Din II. He wrote 'Kitaab ul-Azhaar'.

Death
Syedna Husain resided in Shibam Hadramawt and is buried in Masaar, Yemen.

References

Sources
 
 

15th-century births
Year of birth unknown

1527 deaths
Banu al-Walid al-Anf
16th century in Yemen
Tayyibi da'is
15th-century Arabs
16th-century Arabs
16th-century Ismailis
16th-century Islamic religious leaders